After Hours is a 1985 American black comedy thriller film directed by Martin Scorsese and written by Joseph Minion. The film follows Paul Hackett, portrayed by Griffin Dunne, as he experiences a series of misadventures while making his way home from New York City's SoHo district during the night.

After Hours received positive reviews with praises for its black humor, and is considered to be a cult film. The film won the Independent Spirit Award for Best Feature. Scorsese won the Cannes Film Festival Award for Best Director and the Independent Spirit Award for Best Director for the film.

Plot
After a boring day at work, Paul Hackett, a computer data entry worker, meets Marcy Franklin in a local cafe in New York City. Marcy tells him that she is living with a sculptor named Kiki Bridges, who makes and sells plaster-of-Paris paperweights resembling cream cheese bagels, and leaves him her number. Later in the night, after calling the number under the pretense of buying a paperweight, Paul takes a cab to the apartment. On the way, his $20 bill is blown out the window of the cab, leaving him with only some change, much to the incredulity of the cab driver. At the apartment, Paul meets Kiki, who is working on a sculpture of a cowering screaming man reminiscent of Edvard Munch's "The Scream". Paul comes across several pieces of evidence throughout the visit that imply Marcy is disfigured from burns which, along with Marcy's increasingly strange behavior, lead him to slip out of the apartment abruptly.

Paul attempts to go home by subway, but the fare has increased at the stroke of midnight. He goes to a bar where Julie, a waitress, immediately becomes enamored with him. At the bar, Paul learns that there has been a string of burglaries in the neighborhood. The bartender, Tom Schorr, offers to give Paul money for a subway token, but he is unable to open the cash register. They exchange keys so Paul can go to Tom's place to fetch the cash register key. Afterward, Paul spots two burglars, Neil and Pepe, with Kiki's man sculpture. After he confronts them, they flee, dropping the sculpture in the process. When Paul returns the sculpture to Kiki and Marcy's apartment, Kiki encourages him to apologize to Marcy. However, when he attempts to do so, he discovers Marcy has committed suicide; Kiki and a man named Horst have already left to go to a place called Club Berlin. Paul reports Marcy's death before remembering he was supposed to return Tom's keys.

Paul attempts to return to Tom's bar, but it is locked out with a sign indicating that Tom will be back in half an hour. Paul meets Julie again on the street, and she invites him up to her apartment to wait for Tom, where Paul is unnerved by her own strange behavior. He then returns to Tom's bar only for Tom to get a call informing him of the death of Marcy, who was his girlfriend. Paul decides to return to Julie's apartment, where she begins to sketch his portrait while they talk. Ultimately, Paul rejects Julie's advances and leaves. In search of Kiki and Horst to inform them of Marcy's suicide, he goes to Club Berlin, where a group of punks attempt to shave his head into a mohawk. Narrowly escaping, Paul meets an ice cream truck driver named Gail, who eventually mistakes him for the burglar plaguing the neighborhood, and she and a mob of local residents relentlessly pursue him.

When Paul meets a man and asks for help, the man assumes that he is looking for a gay hookup. Paul finds Tom again, but the mob (with the assistance of Julie, Gail, and Gail's Mister Softee truck) pursues Paul. Paul discovers that as payback for rejecting her, Julie used his image in a wanted poster that names him as the burglar. He ultimately seeks refuge back at Club Berlin just as it is about to close for the night. Paul uses his last quarter to play "Is That All There Is?" by Peggy Lee and asks a woman named June to dance. Paul explains he is being pursued and June, also a sculptor who lives in the club's basement, offers to help him. When Paul is inadvertently doused in plaster stored in her studio, June protects him by applying swaths of papier-mâché all over his head and body in order to disguise him as a sculpture while the mob searches the club for him. After the mob leaves, however, June refuses his request to take off the plaster out of concern they might return and it soon hardens, trapping Paul in a position that resembles Kiki's sculpture. Neil and Pepe then break into Club Berlin and steal Paul, thinking him to be the sculpture they had dropped in the street earlier, and place him in the back of their van. As the van speeds uptown and takes a sharp turn which swings open the van's back door, Paul falls to the pavement, crashed free of the plaster, directly outside the front gate of his office building just as the sun is rising. Paul brushes himself off and goes to his desk where his computer screen greets him good morning, bringing the film full circle.

Cast

Themes and motifs 
This film belongs in a grouping that revolves around a young working professional who is placed under threat, named the "yuppie nightmare cycle", a subgenre of films which combine two genres in itself – screwball comedy and film noir. Some critics present a psychoanalytic view of the film; Paul is constantly emasculated by women in the film: by Kiki with her sexual aggressiveness and a lust for masochism, Marcy turning down his sexual advances, Julie and Gail turning a vigilante mob on him, and June entrapping him in plaster, rendering him helpless. There are many references to castration within the film, most of which are shown when women are present. In the bathroom in Terminal Bar where Julie first encounters Paul, there is an image scrawled on the wall of a shark biting a man's erect penis. Marcy makes a reference to her husband using a double entendre when saying, "I broke the whole thing off" when talking about her and her husband's sex life. One of the mouse traps that surrounds her bed clamps shut when Julie tries to seduce Paul.

Michael Rabiger in his book titled Directing saw mythological symbolism as a primary theme used by Scorsese stating: "The hero of Scorsese's dark comedy After Hours is like a rat trying to escape from a labyrinth. Indeed there is a caged rat in one scene where Paul finds himself trapped in a talkative woman's apartment. The film could be plotted out as a labyrinthine journey, each compartment holding out the promise of a particular experience, almost all illusory and misleading".

Production
Paramount Pictures' abandonment of The Last Temptation of Christ production was a huge disappointment to Scorsese. It spurred him to focus on independent companies and smaller projects. The opportunity was offered to him by his lawyer Jay Julien, who put him through Griffin Dunne and Amy Robinson's independent group: Double Play Company. The project was called One Night in Soho and it was based on the script by Joseph Minion. The screenplay, originally titled Lies after the 1982 Joe Frank monologue that inspired the story, was written as part of an assignment for his film course at Columbia University. According to Frank, he was not asked for rights to the story, asking "what must the screenwriter have been thinking to place himself in such jeopardy?"
Minion was 26 years old at the time the film was produced. The script finally became After Hours after Scorsese made his final amendments.

One of Scorsese's inputs involves the dialogue between Paul and the doorman at Club Berlin, inspired by Franz Kafka's "Before the Law," one of the short stories included in his novel The Trial. As Scorsese explained to Paul Attanasio, the short story reflected his frustration toward the production of The Last Temptation of Christ, for which he had to continuously wait, as Joseph K had to in The Trial.

The film was originally to be directed by Tim Burton, but Scorsese read the script at a time when he was unable to get financial backing to complete The Last Temptation of Christ, and Burton gladly stepped aside when Scorsese expressed interest in directing.

After Hours was the first fictional film directed by Scorsese since Alice Doesn't Live Here Anymore in 1974 in which Robert De Niro was not part of the cast.

British director Michael Powell took part in the production process of the film (Powell and editor Thelma Schoonmaker married soon afterward). Nobody was sure how the film should end. Powell said that Paul must finish up back at work, but this was initially dismissed as too unlikely and difficult. They tried many other endings, and a few were even filmed, but the only one that everyone felt really worked was to have Paul finish up back at work just as the new day was starting.

Music
The musical score for After Hours was composed by Howard Shore, who has collaborated on multiple occasions with Scorsese. Although an official soundtrack album was not released, many of Shore's cues appear on the 2009 album Howard Shore: Collector's Edition Vol. 1. In addition to the score, other music credited at the end of the film is:

 "Symphony in D Major, K. 95 (K. 73n): 1st movement" attributed to Wolfgang Amadeus Mozart
 "Air on the G String (Air From Suite No. 3)" by Johann Sebastian Bach
 "En la Cueva" Performed by Cuadro Flamenco
 "Sevillanas" Composed and performed by Manitas de Plata
 "Night and Day", Words and music written by Cole Porter
 "Body and Soul" Composed by Johnny Green
 "Quando quando quando", Music by Tony Renis, Lyrics by Pat Boone
 "Someone to Watch Over Me", Lyrics by Ira Gershwin, Music by George Gershwin, performed by Robert & Johnny
 "You're Mine" Written by Robert Carr and Johnny Mitchell, performed by Robert & Johnny
 "We Belong Together" Performed by Robert & Johnny
 "Angel Baby" Written by Rosie Hamlin, performed by Rosie and the Originals
 "Last Train to Clarksville" Composed by Bobby Hart and Tommy Boyce, written by Tommy Boyce and Bobby Hart, performed by The Monkees
 "Chelsea Morning" Composed and performed by Joni Mitchell
 "I Don't Know Where I Stand" Composed and performed by Joni Mitchell
 "Over the Mountain; Across the Sea" Composed by Rex Garvin, performed by Johnnie and Joe
 "One Summer Night" Written by Danny Webb, Performed by The Danleers
 "Pay to Cum" Written and performed by the band Bad Brains
 "Is That All There Is?" Composed by Jerry Leiber and Mike Stoller, performed by Peggy Lee

Reception
The film grossed only $10.1 million in the United States, but was given positive reviews and went on to be considered an "underrated" Scorsese film. The film did, however, garner Scorsese the Best Director Award at the 1986 Cannes Film Festival and allowed the director to take a hiatus from the tumultuous development of The Last Temptation of Christ.

Film critic Roger Ebert gave After Hours a positive review and a rating of four out of four stars. He praised the film as one of the year's best and said it "continues Scorsese's attempt to combine comedy and satire with unrelenting pressure and a sense of all-pervading paranoia." He later added the film to his "Great Movies" list. In The New York Times, Vincent Canby gave the film a mixed review and called it an "entertaining tease, with individually arresting sequences that are well acted by Mr. Dunne and the others, but which leave you feeling somewhat conned."

On the review aggregator website Rotten Tomatoes, After Hours holds an approval rating of 91% based on 57 reviews, with an average rating of 7.8/10. The site's critics consensus reads: "Bursting with frantic energy and tinged with black humor, After Hours is a masterful – and often overlooked – detour in Martin Scorsese's filmography." At Metacritic, which assigns a normalized rating to reviews, the film has a weighted average score of 90 out of 100, based on eight critics, indicating "universal acclaim".

Warner Home Video released the film on VHS and Betamax in 1986, and both widescreen and pan-and-scan NTSC LaserDiscs. It has also been released on DVD.

Accolades

See also
 List of American films of 1985
 Desperately Seeking Susan - 1985 comedy-drama film with a similar theme
 Something Wild - 1986 action comedy film with a similar theme
 Who's That Girl - 1987 screwball comedy film with a similar theme

References

External links

 
 
 
 
 
 

1985 films
1985 comedy films
1980s American films
1980s black comedy films
1980s English-language films
American black comedy films
American independent films
American satirical films
Films about suicide
Films directed by Martin Scorsese
Films scored by Howard Shore
Films set in Manhattan
Films shot in New York City
The Geffen Film Company films
Hyperlink films
Independent Spirit Award for Best Film winners
Warner Bros. films